Procopio Ortíz (8 July 1904 – 12 January 1980) was a Mexican equestrian. He competed in two events at the 1932 Summer Olympics.

References

External links
 

1904 births
1980 deaths
Mexican male equestrians
Olympic equestrians of Mexico
Equestrians at the 1932 Summer Olympics
Place of birth missing